The electoral district of Wimmera was an electoral district of the Legislative Assembly in the Australian state of Victoria. 

It was defined initially as "Bounded on the West by the Boundary Line of Victoria and South Australia; on the North by the River Murray; on the East by a Line to Lake Bael Bael, thence by the River Avoca to its Source; and on the South by the Boundaries of the Counties of Follett, Dundas and Ripon".

In the Electoral Act of 1858 (which took effect in 1859), Wimmera was reduced in size and to one member; the Electoral district of Crowlands was created which incorporated part of the previous Wimmera district.

In the Electoral Act of 1877 established the seat as a two-member constituency, reabsorbing Crowlands.

In the redistribution of 1889, Wimmera was abolished and new districts including Horsham, Lowan and Donald & Swan Hill were created.

Members for Wimmera
Two members initially, one member 1859–1877, two members 1877–1889.

Madden went on to represent the new Electoral district of Horsham from 1889.
Baker went on to represent the new Electoral district of Lowan from 1889.

Election results

References

Former electoral districts of Victoria (Australia)
1856 establishments in Australia
1889 disestablishments in Australia
1992 establishments in Australia
2002 disestablishments in Australia